Saatköy is a village in the Fındıklı District, Rize Province, in Black Sea Region of Turkey. Its population is 173 (2021).

History 
According to list of villages in Laz language book (2009), name of the village is Tsati, which means "sky homeland". Most villagers are ethnically Laz.

Geography

References

Villages in Fındıklı District
Laz settlements in Turkey